Hakobavank, also known as Metsaranits Monastery, is an Armenian monastery, which is situated near the village of Kolatak in the disputed region of Nagorno-Karabakh, de facto in the Republic of Artsakh and de jure in Azerbaijan.

History 
Hakobavank was established in the 5th-7th centuries. It acquired its final form by the 11th-12th centuries. In the 14th century the monastery became the deaconry of the Mets Arank (Metsarants) province. The complex was named after St. Hakob Mtsbnetsi, who professed Christianity in Armenia, and whose relics were kept in the monastery until the 19th century. 

There is no information about the date of foundation of the monastery. The oldest inscription, carved on the pedestal of a khachkar (cross-stone), refers to the year of 853. According to the historical chronicles, the monastery buildings were built, rebuilt and reconstructed periodically between the 9th and 18th centuries. One of the manuscripts kept in Matenadaran says that the Metsaranits Church was rebuilt by Khorinshah Zakarian.

A renovation project of the monastery complex commenced in 2022.

Gallery

References 

Armenian Apostolic monasteries
Christian monasteries in the Republic of Artsakh